Puerto Rico Highway 250 (PR-250)  is the main and longest highway located in Culebra, Puerto Rico.

Route description
Formerly known as PR-998, it runs from the Port of Culebra (pier) near the Dewey town square in a northerly direction until it intersects with the PR-251 in the Clark Community in front of Benjamín Rivera Noriega Airport. From this point, it extends to the east, bordering the north side of Ensenada Honda, reaching the Zoni Beach. This road has direct access to the Sardinas, Mosquito, Larga and Tórtolos beaches in the Flamenco neighborhood.

Major intersections

See also

 List of highways numbered 250

References

External links
 

250
Culebra, Puerto Rico